Randall Feenstra may refer to:
Randall M. Feenstra, physicist 
Randy Feenstra (born 1969), American politician